Dmitry Yulianovich Sitkovetsky (born September 27, 1954) is a Soviet-Russian born classical violinist, conductor and arranger, most notably of an arrangement for strings of J. S. Bach's Goldberg Variations.

Early life 

Dmitry Sitkovetsky was born in Baku, Azerbaijan, to violinist Julian Sitkovetsky and pianist Bella Davidovich. His mother, the winner of the 1949 Chopin Competition, came from a family of three generations of musicians; his father won several International competitions and had already established himself as a violinist and artist of exceptional quality by his death at age 32, when Sitkovetsky was three years old. After his father's death, the family moved to Moscow, where Sitkovetsky entered the Moscow Conservatory. In 1977, aged 22, he decided to leave the Soviet Union. Sitkovetsky arrived in New York City on September 11, 1977, and immediately began studying at the Juilliard School.

Career 

Sitkovetsky has built up a successful career as a violinist, conductor, arranger, chamber musician and festival director.

Over the four decades since the launch of his career in Vienna's Musikverein in 1979, Sitkovetsky has formed close relationships and has worked with many of the world's great conductors and orchestras, including Sir Neville Marriner, Mariss Jansons, Sir Colin Davis, Yuri Temirkanov; the Berlin Philharmonic, Royal Concertgebouw Orchestra, London Symphony, Philharmonia, Chicago Symphony, Cleveland Orchestra, New York Philharmonic, Los Angeles Philharmonic, Philadelphia Orchestra, Leipzig Gewandhaus, Bayerischer RF, Munich Philarmonicc and the NHK Symphony. He has made more than 40 recordings as a violinist, reflecting the breadth of his repertoire from Bach to Rodion Shchedrin.

Sitkovetsky has also established a flourishing career as a conductor, and has worked with orchestras such as Academy of St-Martin-In-The-Fields, London Philharmonic, Orchestre de Chambre de Paris, Orchestra della Toscana, San Francisco Symphony, Dallas Symphony, Shanghai Symphony, and Tokyo Metropolitan Orchestra. In 1990, he founded the New European Strings Chamber Orchestra (NES), bringing together distinguished string players from the top European ensembles of both Russian and Western musical backgrounds (reflecting his own life story). Since 2003, Sitkovetsky has served as the Music Director of the Greensboro Symphony Orchestra, North Carolina, to which he has brought such soloists as Emmanuel Ax, Yefim Bronfman, Lynn Harrell, and Pinchas Zukerman. Previous positions of artistic leadership have included the Orquesta Sinfónica de Castilla y Leon (Artist in Residence, 2006-2009), Russian State Symphony Orchestra ‘Evgeny Svetlanov’ (Principal Guest Conductor, 2002-2005), and the Ulster Orchestra (Principal Conductor & Artistic Advisor, 1996-2001).

As violinist and guest conductor, Sitkovetsky's 2019/2020 season was busy and varied until all musical life was truncated by the COVID-19 pandemic. He was performing extensively throughout Europe, North America, and Asia, with such orchestras as the Lucerne Symphony, Orchestra della Toscana, Royal Philharmonic Orchestra, Russian State Symphony Orchestra ‘Evgeny Svetlanov’, Sapporo Symphony, Japan Century Symphony, and the Slovenian Philharmonic Orchestra.

As live performance came to an end in 2020, Sitkovetsky turned his attention to creating an innovative online presence with the New European Strings. He brought together remotely a distinguished ensemble of musicians, playing the transcriptions he calls his "Opus Coronavirus". He took Leonid Desyatnikov's piano cycle The Bukovina Preludes, transcribed them, and recorded them distantly with his NES Virtual Ensemble. These as well as the new Bach Dance Suite transcriptions have been enthusiastically received by a virtual audience of 250,000 on social media.

Sitkovetsky's debut TEDx Talk, "The Power of Curiosity", focused on the importance and unexpected joy of thinking outside the box, as well as the need always to reinvent yourself. His 10-part interview series on Medici.tv ("It Ain’t Necessarily So"), featuring such stars as Evgeny Kissin, Mischa Maisky, Leonidas Kavakos and Yefim Bronfman was reaired last summer and inspired a new series, "Sitkovetsky & Friends", in which Sitkovetsky interviews the soloists for the upcoming season of the Greensboro Symphony. He recently launched a new programme, "Transformation: the Art of reinvention at the time of the Pandemic”, which goes out live on his YouTube channel every Sunday and features conversations with his friends and colleagues such as Sir Antonio Pappano, Viktoria Mullova, Barry Douglas, and Roger Vignoles.

Sitkovetsky has created, developed and led a number of festivals, including the Korsholm Music Festival, Finland (1983-1993, and 2002), the Seattle International Music Festival (1992-1997), the Silk Route of Music, Azerbaijan (1999), and the Festival del Sole, Tuscany (2003-2006). In 2018/2019, he was invited as Artist-in-Residence of Vadim Repin's Trans-Siberian Festival. He is a close partner and a regular guest at other distinguished festivals, including the Verbier Festival, Festival Ljubljana, and the George Enescu Festival.

Sitkovetsky's name is now synonymous with the art of transcription.. His iconic orchestral and string trio versions of Bach's Goldberg Variations set a benchmark in transcription and continue to be heard regularly in performances and recordings by many of the world's leading performers. Following their success, Sitkovetsky has gone on to arrange over 50 works of major repertoire by composers such as Bartók, Beethoven, Brahms, Haydn, Schnittke, and Shostakovich. In 2015, he unveiled his transcription of Stravinsky's Le baiser de la fée, commissioned by the Orpheus Chamber Orchestra, and premiered by Augustin Hadelich at Carnegie Hall; in the 2017/2018 season, a new multi-genre/multimedia work, Devil, Soldier & Violin (inspired by Stravinsky's L'histoire du soldat) premiered in Moscow's Tchaikovsky Concert Hall with sold-out performances across Russia. In the summer 2018, the Verbier Festival commissioned and gave the world premiere of Sitkovetsky's transcription of Sarasate's Navarra Fantasy. This performance, which marked the festival's 25th anniversary, was broadcast live worldwide on Medici.tv, with an all-star lineup of musicians including Lisa Batiashvili, Leonidas Kavakos, Mischa Maisky, Vadim Repin, Maxim Vengerov, Tabea Zimmermann, and Pinchas Zukerman.

Personal life 

Since 1987 Sitkovetsky has resided in London with his wife, Susan, and their daughter, Julia, a professional opera singer.

References

External links 
 Dmitry Sitkovetsky greensborosymphony.org
 Inspired Minds page
 NY Times article
Dmitry Sitkovetsky Website
Dmitry Sitkovetsky YouTube
Dmitry Sitkovetsky Official Facebook Page

Soviet classical violinists
20th-century classical violinists
Russian classical violinists
Male classical violinists
Russian Jews
Jewish violinists
Musicians from Baku
1954 births
Living people
Soviet emigrants to the United States
Soviet emigrants to the United Kingdom
21st-century classical violinists
20th-century Russian male musicians
21st-century Russian male musicians